Matthew Robinson (born 22 March 1984 in Ipswich, Suffolk, England) is an English footballer who played as a midfielder in the Football League.

Career
Robinson came through the youth team of Ipswich Town and made 11 appearances scoring 12 goals for the youth team in the 2001–02 season. However, he failed to make a first team appearance at Portman Road and he signed non-contract terms at Football League One side Bournemouth, but was released after a month. He then signed for Football League Two team Cambridge United in February 2004. He played nine first team for United, but was released in January 2005, and joined local neighbours Cambridge City.

References

External links

1984 births
Footballers from Suffolk
Sportspeople from Ipswich
Living people
English footballers
Association football midfielders
Ipswich Town F.C. players
AFC Bournemouth players
Cambridge United F.C. players
Cambridge City F.C. players
English Football League players